Saleh "Charlie" Sadadeen, sometimes spelt Sadadene, (c.1870 – 19 July 1933) was an Afghan cameleer and bushman who lived in Alice Springs in the Northern Territory of Australia.

Cameleer

Sadadeen was born in Baloochistan around 1870. By 1880 he was working as a camel man for Lord Roberts on the march to Kandahar.

It is thought he immigrated to Australia after obtaining work near Oodnadatta in South Australia at the time the railway line was completed in 1890. He was working with camel teams by 1902 for the Wallis Brothers, carting goods from Oodnadatta to Stuart, now Alice Springs and to Arltunga. By 1914 he managed a strong of 120–130 camels, half belonging to him, the other half to Wallis and Co. Legendary bushman Walter Smith worked for Sadadeen for about 15 years. He described him as a hard man but deeply respected his skills and practices. Smith suffered from migraines and describes Sadadeen leaving him under a tree with a billy of water, expecting him to catch up to the camel train upon recovery.

Sadadeen married Annie Markham, but the relationship ended. They had no children.

A devout Muslim, he was a leader for the Afghan community in their worship at a small mosque on Todd Street in Alice Springs. Sadadeen lived on Todd Street in central Alice Springs where he grew flowers, including at times, opium. He also grew vegetables at a place called Sadadeen Swamp about 30 kilometres south of Alice Springs. The land on which the Alice Springs Town Council is currently sited was once Charlie Sadadeen's market garden. Two date palms planted in this garden can still be seen.

Legacy

Sadadeen died in Alice Springs in 1933.

There is a monument and park dedicated to Sadadeen and his fellow cameleers outside the Alice Springs Town Council, on the block where Sadadeen lived. The Alice Springs suburb of Sadadeen is named after him, as is Sadadeen Primary School. Sadadeen Range on the east of Alice Springs also takes his name, which was where he kept his camels.

References

Australian businesspeople
1870 births
1933 deaths
People from Alice Springs